The Pescara Pass is a mountain pass through the Abruzzi Apennines along the Pescara River. It lies south of Gran Sasso d'Italia, Italy. 

A railroad from Pescara to Rome passes through several tunnels through and under the pass.  The Valerian Way, an old Roman road, went through the pass.

Notes

References

 Webster's New Geographical Dictionary, Third Edition. Springfield, Massachusetts: Merriam-Webster, Inc., 1997. .

Mountain passes of Italy
Mountain passes of the Apennines